The women's 100 metre freestyle event at the 1960 Olympic Games took place between August 26 and 29. This swimming event used freestyle swimming, which means that the method of the stroke is not regulated (unlike backstroke, breaststroke, and butterfly events). Nearly all swimmers use the front crawl or a variant of that stroke. Because an Olympic-size swimming pool is 50 metres long, this race consisted of two lengths of the pool.

Competition format

The competition used a three-round (heats, semifinals, final) format. The advancement rule followed the format introduced in 1952. A swimmer's place in the heat was not used to determine advancement; instead, the fastest times from across all heats in a round were used. There were 7 heats of between 6 and 8 swimmers each. The top 24 swimmers advanced to the semifinals. There were 3 semifinals of 8 swimmers each. The top 8 swimmers advanced to the final. Swim-offs were used as necessary to break ties.

Results

Heats

Five heats were held; the swimmers with the fastest 16 times advanced to the semifinals. Those that advanced are highlighted. This round took place on August 26.

Semifinals
Two semifinal races were held; the fastest eight swimmers advanced to the Final. The athletes that advanced are highlighted. The semifinals were held August 27.

Semifinal 1

Semifinal 2

Final

The Final was held on August 29.

References

WOmen's freestyle 100 metre
1960 in women's swimming
Women's events at the 1960 Summer Olympics